Dumbo feather (formerly named Dumbo feather, pass it on) is an Australian quarterly cultural periodical which is described by its publishers as a mook – half magazine, half book - because it is issued regularly like a magazine, but has the appearance of a book. It is based in St Kilda, Victoria.

History and profile
Dumbo feather was launched in June 2004 by Kate Bezar, a New Zealander who had originally worked in consulting. After a trip to the newsagent, looking for inspiration, Bezar realised there was no magazine that she really identified with. This catalysed the creation of Dumbo Feather - an interview magazine profiling extraordinary people from around the world.

In 2011, Small Giants (a social enterprise founded by Berry Liberman and Danny Almagor) took over the magazine. It was relaunched with a new team and design.

In each quarterly issue, five individuals are interviewed. Past interviewees include Jimmy Wales, Ray Lawrence, David De Rothschild, Rusty Young, Kirsty Gusmão, Kevin Roberts, Karen Martini, Graeme Murphy, Craig Ruddy, Lisa Gerrard, Jimmy Pham, Sruli Recht, Tenzin Palmo, Sabrina Ward Harrison, Rachael Kohn, Margaret Wertheim, Marcus Westbury, and David Trubridge.

Dumbo feather is based in Australia, but has a substantial overseas market.

Dumbo feather is printed on 100% recycled paper using soy-based inks.

References and Notes

 Dumbo feather interview at Lovemarks.com
 Interview with Kate Bezar at The Design Files
Dumbo feather interview with girlwithasatchel blog

External links

2004 establishments in Australia
Quarterly magazines published in Australia
Cultural magazines
Magazines established in 2004
Magazines published in Melbourne